Sir Richard Vernon, 3rd Baronet (22 June 1678 – 1 October 1725) was a British diplomat and politician.

He succeeded in the baronetcy in 1683, when aged only five. He was commissioned a lieutenant in the 2nd Regiment of Foot Guards on 10 November 1702, but left the regiment in 1703. He became a Member of the Irish Parliament for Monaghan Borough in 1703 and sat for it until 1713.

Envoy to Poland
Vernon was subsequently dispatched as British envoy to Poland, also visiting Dresden.  On his way he passed through The Hague in September 1715.  The following April he travelled from Dresden to Danzig to attend the wedding between the Duke of Mecklenburg and the Tsar's niece, a splendid affair.  The following October, he passed through Berlin on his way to Gohr,  returning in November.  He was still in Berlin a month later, but about to go to Dresden to await the king of Poland there or go on to Poland.  By October 1718, he had been superseded and returned to England.

He died in Poland in 1723 in the court of Augustus II the Strong.

References

1678 births
1725 deaths
Baronets in the Baronetage of England
Coldstream Guards officers
Irish MPs 1703–1713
Members of the Parliament of Ireland (pre-1801) for County Monaghan constituencies
Ambassadors of Great Britain to Poland